Khwaja Aziz Chishti, was a 14th-century Sufi Muslim figure in the Sylhet region. Aziz's name is associated with the propagation of Islam in Balaganj. In 1303, he joined Shah Jalal in the Conquest of Sylhet.

Aziz met Shah Jalal and decided to accompany him in his expedition across the Indian subcontinent. In 1303, he took part in the final battle of the Conquest of Sylhet under Shah Jalal's leadership against Raja Gour Govinda. Aziz died a few years after the conquest, and was buried in a mazar (mausoleum) in Nij Gohorpur, Balaganj.

References

People from Balaganj Upazila
14th-century Indian Muslims
Chishtis
14th-century imams
Bengali Sufi saints